Lee Walton is an American visual artist whose artwork is regularly associated with the subject of sports. Walton has exhibited his work internationally in a variety of media including drawing, concept based systems, performance art, video art, net art, and public projects. Several projects by Walton were included in the 2013 visual art exhibition Art of Sport at CEPA Gallery in Buffalo, New York.

Academic career
Walton holds a Master of Fine Arts Degree from the California College of the Arts and a Bachelor of Fine Art Degree from San Jose State University. He is currently an Assistant Professor at University of North Carolina at Greensboro.

Walton has lectured at Massachusetts Institute of Technology (MIT), Art in General, The New School, Portland State University, Art Institute of Boston, University of Ulster in Belfast, Northern Ireland, and Columbia University.

Projects
Much of Walton's work involves sports. For example, in 2004 to 2005 Walton organized a free throw contest with basketball player Shaquille O'Neal; for every free throw by O'Neal, Walton attempted one, hoping to beat O'Neal's average.

In another piece, "One Shot A Day", Walton changed the rules of golf and made a single swing each day. Playing 18 holes this way took him close to 5 months, from March 26 to August 15 in 2003. During that period, each day he published a video of his swing on his website. One Shot a Day was featured in the Art of Sport Exhibition at CEPA Gallery in Buffalo, New York.

"Red Ball", 2001, was an online project presented by Silent Gallery. Walton placed a little Red Ball at a specific location in the city of San Francisco. The location of where the Red Ball should be placed depends solely on the participation of the visitors.

"Wappenings" is a series of Web Happenings taking place in New York City. The Wappenings involve visitors to Walton's site, LeeWalton.com, and call forth their participation in finishing the project piece. A new web page announces that an event will be or is currently happening. The Wappenings are usually not announced in advance, and a time is never announced. As of 2004 this project is ongoing.

"Life/Theater" is an ongoing project since 2004. This project mixes 'real life' and 'theater'. Walton orchestrates performances which involves carefully selected actors and numerous unknowing participants. The actors blend themselves in with the real characters and reveal themselves at the end of the performance. Walton exhibited Life/Theater in 2007 at Southern Exposure in San Francisco.

In 2003, Walton began The City Systems. In this project, he creates a step-by-step manual to guide someone through a city, reaching specific and predetermined locations and experiences. The project was at first located just in New York, but has since created navigation guides for other cities as well.

"Union Square: Giving It Up For Life" is a project that included his leaving Union Square and never returning again.

In 2007, Walton came up with "Hillary Wiedemann: Living Record", a piece in which a public performance took place on the streets of New York, and the only witness was Hillary Wiedemann. Wiedemann, of Artist Space, would then become the only living record of this performance. This project emphasized how her memory and oral accounts would then be the only indication of if and how this performance existed.

"The Serial Conversationalist" was a project of Walton's in 2007 in which Walton would initiate conversations with people on systematically determined days and times, and on specific benches. The project was exhibited in "Character Reference."

"Come On Pilgrim: A 110-Mile Exhibition," a project Walton took on in 2007, is an experimental piece of work created in New York. It is an audio and map companion that guides its visitors through six commissioned projects that are physically and strategically placed in route on the  road between New York and the Center for Curatorial Studies at Bard College (CCS Bard).

"Stacked" took place in New York from May to September 2005, as part of the exhibition "Sport." Walton purchased 35 pound plates in the Upper East Side of Manhattan, then walked them to the Socrates Sculpture Park where he stacked them on a vertical metal pole.

"Remote Instructions" is a 2007 and ongoing project of Walton's that is funded by Rhizome.org, New York. It is a web-central project that makes use of the web's communication and the spectatorship of its users. Walton would work together with strangers from around the world via the web and construct video performances that take place in neighborhoods, cities, town and villages internationally. The projects created are exhibited at the New Museum of Contemporary Art in New York.

Performances
In 2013 Walton created World Series Game One, a performance and installation system for CEPA Gallery's Art of Sport exhibition. The performance was timed to coincide with the playing of game one of the 2013 MLB World Series. A live broadcast of game one of the World Series was simulcast inside the gallery, while Walton and a team of artist volunteers spontaneously responded to the play calling by the broadcasters.

Produced in 2004, Up is an approximately two-minute long video which takes place in New York. This video performance was created for the purposes of One Block Radius, an extensive psycho-geographic project created by Glowlab for the New Museum of Contemporary Art in New York.

Produced in 2010, "The Rules for Staying Young" was a performance where Walton created a 3x6 module grid and created rules to the May 8, Mets vs Giants baseball game. Walton viewed the game live from his home and via skype watched as the installation crew (Benjamin Austin, Jacob Koestler, Jane Quartarone, Ryin Jones & Travis Ferguson) added to the grid from the rules given to them by Walton. The Performance was shown from May 7–30 at New Wilmington Art Association in Delaware.

Awards, honors, and commissions
 2008 Commission, Jet Blue: Video Installation at JFK International Airport, Curated by Creative Time, New York, NY 
 2007 Commission, Rhizome at the New Museum of Contemporary Art, New York, NY 
 2005 New Commissions • Art in General New York, New York 
 2005 Performa commission, New York, New York 
 2004 Visiting Artist Project, Indianapolis Museum of Contemporary Art, Indianapolis, Indiana 
 2000 Fellowship, Kala Art Institute, Berkeley, CA

Guest lectures and panels
 Massachusetts Institute of Technology, Cambridge, MA
 Portland State University, Portland, OR
 PICA: Portland Institute of Contemporary Art, Portland, OR

References

External links
 LeeWalton.com
 Lee Walton in the CEPA Galley Art of Sport archive

Modern artists
American contemporary artists
American conceptual artists
California College of the Arts alumni
Year of birth missing (living people)
Living people
American performance artists
San Jose State University alumni